Albert Millaud was a French journalist, writer and stage author, born in Paris, 13 January 1844, and died in the same city on 23 October 1892.

Life and career 
He was the son of the banker Moïse Millaud, the founder of Le Petit Journal.

He studied law (obtaining his doctorate in 1866), but turned his energies to literature and in 1865 published a volume of poetry entitled Fantaisies de jeunesse.

Under the pseudonym Oronte, he wrote articles for La Gazette de Hollande and La Revue de poche which he founded with Abel d’Avrecourt.

For his daily articles in Le Figaro, where he covered parliamentary affairs, he also used the pseudonyms La Bruyère, Saint-Simon, Paul Hémery, Lafontaine and Baron Grimm.

Millaud's first play, written in 1872, was Le Péché véniel. He was the author of the libretto for several opérettes for Jacques Offenbach, Charles Lecocq and Hervé. He married the singer Anna Judic, for whom he wrote Lilli, Niniche, La Roussotte, La Femme à papa and most memorably Mam'zelle Nitouche (in collaboration with Henri Meilhac).

He became a chevalier de la Légion d'honneur in 1877.

Works

Theatre 
 1872: Le Péché véniel, one-act verse play
 1873: Plutus in collaboration with Gaston Jollivet (later an opéra comique, see below)
 1877: La Farce de la femme muette, after Rabelais, first performed at the Théâtre de la Porte Saint-Martin
 1877: Le Collier d'or, one-act verse play
 1882: Lili, comédie-vaudeville in 3 acts, with Alfred Hennequin et Ernest Blum, first performed in Paris at the Théâtre des Variétés on 11 January 1882
 1891: Le Fiacre 117, play in three acts, with Émile de Najac

Music 
 1873: La Quenouille de verre: opéra-bouffe en 3 actes, music by Grisart
 1874: Madame l'archiduc, opéra-bouffe, in three acts, music by Jacques Offenbach
 1875: La Créole, music by Jacques Offenbach
 1875: Les Hannetons, revue de printemps in three acts, five tableaux (with Eugène Grangé), music by Jacques Offenbach
 1875: Plutus, opéra comique in three acts, music by Charles Lecocq
 1878: Niniche, comédie-vaudeville in three acts, with Alfred Hennequin, music by Marius Boullard, first performed at the Théâtre des Variétés on 15 February 1878
 1879: La Femme à papa, comédie-opérette in three acts, with Alfred Hennequin, music by Hervé, first performed at the Théâtre des Variétés on 3 December 1879.
 1881: La Roussotte, comédie-vaudeville in three acts and a prologue, music by Lecocq, Hervé, etc.
 1883: Mam'zelle Nitouche, with Henri Meilhac, music by Hervé
 1886: Egmont, drame-lyrique in four acts, with Albert Wolff, music by Gaston Salvayre

Literature
 1865: Fantaisies de jeunesse -  Librairie du Petit Journal
 1866: Physiologies parisiennes under the pseudonym « La Bruyère ». 120 dessins de Caran d'Ache
 1869-1872: Petite Némésis
 1873: Voyage d’un fantaisiste : Vienne, le Danube, Constantinople
 1876: Lettres du Baron Grimm : Souvenirs, Historiettes et Anecdotes parlementaires
 1878: Les Petites Comédies de la politique
 La Comédie du jour sous la république athénienne - Illustrations de Caran d’Ache.
 Croquis parlementaire

References 

19th-century French dramatists and playwrights
19th-century French journalists
French opera librettists
1844 births
1892 deaths
Chevaliers of the Légion d'honneur
Le Figaro people